"Alien Days" is the first single released from MGMT, the third album by MGMT, which was released as a cassette single on April 20, 2013. VanWyngarden explains the song as the feeling when "a parasitic alien is in your head, controlling things". The music video of this song was filmed by indie director Sam Fleischner, which was the second video released for the promotion of the album.

History
On March 30, 2012, the band premiered "Alien Days", at a show in Bogotá, Colombia, at the Festival Estereo Picnic.

On March 11, 2013, MGMT confirmed on their Twitter account that a Record Store Day release would be a cassette tape (with download card) of the studio version of "Alien Days", which became available on April 20. On March 22, 2013, RSD confirmed that this single will be a Record Store Day exclusive limited release. On April 17, the band previewed the song in a stop motion video showing the unpacking of the cassette.
On October 31 the band premiered video via Noisey.

Track listing

Personnel
 Andrew VanWyngarden – vocals, guitar, bass, drums
 Ben Goldwasser – synths and samples
 Trevor  – Child vocals

Notes

A Trevor is the son of Cool Little Music Shop's owner at Fredonia, NY where the band purchase some of their instruments.

References

External links
Official website

2013 singles
MGMT songs
Record Store Day releases
2013 songs
Columbia Records singles
Songs written by Andrew VanWyngarden
Songs written by Benjamin Goldwasser